Uli is a  town of historic importance situated at the extreme southeast corner of Ihiala local government area of Anambra state in Nigeria.  Its closest neighbouring towns are Amaofuo, Ihiala, Amorka, Ubulu, Ozara, Egbuoma and Ohakpu. Uli town extends westward to the confluence of the rivers of Atamiri and Enyinja, and across Usham Lake down to the lower Niger region.

References

Populated places in Anambra State